Engenheiro Paulo de Frontin is a municipality located in the Brazilian state of Rio de Janeiro. Its population was 14,071 (2020) and its area is 139 km².

References

Municipalities in Rio de Janeiro (state)